Radical Castle is a point-and-click adventure game released for Macintosh in 1986 and distributed as shareware.

Players assume the role of the 'Squire', who after mistaking the princess for a serving wench, is given a choice by the King between death and a quest to recover an oracle stolen by a wizard. At one point of the game an area identical to the opening screen of Enchanted Scepters is shown; if the player chooses to go in the direction one would go in Enchanted Scepters a prompt is given encouraging the player to purchase Enchanted Scepters from Silicon Beach Software.

At the height of its popularity the game made the top 100 downloads on GEnie. It can be played on a modern computer using Mini vMac. Macscene.net featured it as their "Retro game of the week" in August 2010. The review praised the games visuals, sound effects and storyline.

References

External links
Radical Castle playable emulation, at the Internet Archive

1986 video games
First-person adventure games
Classic Mac OS-only games
Classic Mac OS games
Video games developed in the United States